Esmeralda is a Mexican telenovela produced by Salvador Mejía Alejandre for Televisa in 1997. It is a remake of a famous 1970 Venezuelan telenovela of that same name Esmeralda original story by Delia Fiallo. 

It stars Leticia Calderón, Fernando Colunga, Enrique Lizalde, Laura Zapata, Salvador Pineda and Ignacio López Tarso.

On Monday, May 5, 1997, Canal de las Estrellas started broadcasting Esmeralda weekdays at 8:00pm, replacing Mujer, casos de la vida real. The last episode was broadcast on Friday, November 14, 1997 with Desencuentro replacing it the following Monday. It was the first collaboration between Fernando Colunga and Juan Pablo Gamboa, who would both later work in La usurpadora (1998).

In 1998 it was named "The Best Telenovela of the Year" by Premios TVyNovelas.

Plot
Rodolfo Peñareal is obsessed with having a male child. After many miscarriages, his wife Blanca is pregnant again. One night, a girl is born, but they believe that she was born dead.

In the same town, in another, more humble house, a boy is born, but his mother dies during labor. The midwife and Crisanta, the nanny of Blanca, with their best intention and with the aim to calm down Rodolfo, decide to exchange the children.

While Blanca is unconscious, Crisanta gives a pair of emerald earrings to the midwife, forcing her to forget what happened on that night. Once the exchange is done, the midwife Dominga, discovers that the girl is not dead, but now it is too late to right the wrong.

In this way, the boy that was born in a miserable hut sees his first light in the opulence of a big house, while the sweet little girl who was entitled to a golden crib, gives her first steps among ramshackle walls and misery.

Esmeralda, the Peñareal's baby girl, was born blind, but the kindness of her heart provides her the light to be happy and the illusion to believe that someday she will meet love. Her eyes are the "eyes of love".

Time passes and the destiny of both of the children, Esmeralda and José Armando, comes across as they instantly fall in love. However, the obsession, the wish, the family interests, the false love of a woman and the Peñareal's pride to make their lineage prevail, destroy any noble feeling.

Esmeralda and José Armando are the victims in this sea of resentment that, little by little, submerges them into the darkness of indifference.

Cast

Awards and nominations

References

External links

1997 telenovelas
Mexican telenovelas
1997 Mexican television series debuts
1997 Mexican television series endings
Television shows set in Mexico City
Televisa telenovelas
Mexican television series based on Venezuelan television series
Spanish-language telenovelas